The 282nd Armored Brigade "Unirea Principatelor" (Brigada 282 Blindată "Unirea Principatelor") is a Armored brigade of the Romanian Land Forces, originally formed as the 282nd Mechanized Regiment on 24 September 1968 and later designated as 282nd Mechanized Brigade "Unirea Principatelor".

In 1980 and again in 1988, the 282nd Mechanised Regiment at Focșani was listed as being part of the 67th Mechanised Division (Romania), a "Ready Division - Reduced Strength II," (roughly what previous Western systems knew as Category B).
 
The brigade is widely regarded as one of the best-trained units of the Romanian Land Forces; it is subordinated to the 2nd Infantry Division. Its headquarters are still located in Focșani. The brigade operates the TR-85 main battle tank. Together with the subordinated units, the 282nd brigade has been deployed to peacekeeping missions in Angola, Kosovo, Afghanistan, and Iraq.

Organization 2020 
 282nd Armored Brigade "Unirea Principatelor", in Focșani
 284th Tank Battalion "Cuza Vodă", in Galați
 280th Mechanized Infantry Battalion "Căpitan Valter Mărăcineanu", in Focșani
 300th Mechanized Infantry Battalion "Sfântul Andrei", in Galați
 285th Artillery Battalion "Vlaicu Vodă", in Brăila
 288th Anti-aircraft Defense Battalion "Milcov", in Focșani
 469th Logistic Support Battalion "Putna", in Focșani

International Missions
Forces from the 282nd Mechanized Brigade were deployed in Kosovo between 2002 and 2003, and accomplished medevac, as well as other types of peacekeeping missions.
280th and 281st battalions were deployed since 2004 in Afghanistan as part of the ISAF and since 2006 in Iraq as part of the Operation Iraqi Freedom.
300th battalion was deployed in 2008 (January–July) as part of the ISAF in Afghanistan.
280th battalion was deployed in 2010 (Mai-November) as part of the ISAF in Afghanistan.
BDE HQ along with 280th battalion and 300th battalion were deployed in 2012 as part of the ISAF in Afghanistan.

References

External links
   Official Site of the Romanian Land Forces
  Official Site of the 2nd Infantry Division
  The 282nd Armored Brigade
  Additional official webpage 

Brigades of Romania
Armoured brigades
Military units and formations established in 1968